Zachary Philip Fonnereau (London, 31 January 1706 – 15 August 1778) was a British businessman and politician, the fourth son of Claude Fonnereau of Christchurch Mansion, Ipswich, a London merchant of Huguenot extraction. 

Fonnereau played a prominent role in financing the Seven Years' War, and served as a director of the East India Company in 1753 and 1754.

He was returned as the Member of Parliament for Aldeburgh at the 1747 election on the interest of his brother, Thomas Fonnereau, who had developed an independent interest in the borough at the expense of the Government (which had formerly controlled it by patronage). However, Zachary consistently voted in support of Government when in Parliament.

By his marriage to Margaret Martyn, he left five children, two of whom also served as Members of Parliament for Aldeburgh:
Philip Fonnereau (1739–1797), MP for Aldeburgh from 1761 to 1768
Martyn Fonnereau (1741–1817), MP for Aldeburgh from 1779 to 1784
Charlotte Fonnereau (28 January 1742 – 15 November 1806)
Fanny Fonnereau (7 January 1744 – 10 January 1827), married George Stainforth, Jr., on 22 March 1777 at Cornhill, died childless
Thomas Fonnereau (21 January 1746 – 26 December 1788), married Harriet Hanson on 19 October 1786 and left children, including the author and artist Thomas George Fonnereau

References

1706 births
1778 deaths
Directors of the British East India Company
Members of the Parliament of Great Britain for English constituencies
British MPs 1747–1754
British MPs 1754–1761
British MPs 1761–1768
British MPs 1768–1774